Henrykowo may refer to the following places:
Henrykowo, Leszno County in Greater Poland Voivodeship (west-central Poland)
Henrykowo, Masovian Voivodeship (east-central Poland)
Henrykowo, Podlaskie Voivodeship (north-east Poland)
Henrykowo, Środa Wielkopolska County in Greater Poland Voivodeship (west-central Poland)
Henrykowo, Kętrzyn County in Warmian-Masurian Voivodeship (north Poland)
Henrykowo, Lidzbark County in Warmian-Masurian Voivodeship (north Poland)
Henrykowo, Ostróda County in Warmian-Masurian Voivodeship (north Poland)